Marc Robert Bulger (born April 5, 1977) is an American former professional football player who was a quarterback in the National Football League (NFL) for eleven seasons, primarily with the St. Louis Rams. He was drafted by the New Orleans Saints in the sixth round of the 2000 NFL Draft and was also a member of the Atlanta Falcons and Baltimore Ravens, but played the entirety of his regular season career with the Rams.

College career
Bulger played college football at West Virginia University. He was a sport management major.

College statistics

Professional career

New Orleans Saints/Atlanta Falcons
Bulger was selected by the New Orleans Saints in the sixth round of the 2000 NFL Draft, 168th overall, and spent training camp with the team before being waived. He was the fifth quarterback taken in the draft and one of the six taken before Tom Brady.

Bulger then spent two weeks on the practice squad of the Atlanta Falcons during the 2000 season.

St. Louis Rams
After spending time on the St. Louis Rams practice squad late in the 2000 season, Bulger was re-signed by the Rams on January 12, 2001. Bulger did not see action in any contests during his first season with the Rams; he was inactive as the third quarterback for 16 regular season games and all three postseason contests.

2002 season 
In 2002, after the Rams started 0–5, Bulger filled in for an injured Jamie Martin, who had been filling in for the injured Kurt Warner. Bulger finished the season with a 6–0 record in games that he both started and finished, but he was injured early in a game against the Seattle Seahawks, and the Rams ended the season at 7–9.

2003 season 
Bulger entered the 2003 season as Warner's backup, but was promoted to No. 1 on the depth chart after Warner committed five turnovers and suffered a concussion in an opening week loss to the New York Giants. Bulger then led the Rams to a regular-season record of 12–4, securing the NFC West title and a first-round bye. The Rams went on to lose a double-overtime thriller to the eventual NFC Champion Carolina Panthers in the divisional round of the playoffs. Bulger made the Pro Bowl where he was the game's MVP.

2004 season 

Bulger's performance in 2003 solidified his position as the Rams' starting quarterback. Warner was released in June 2004, and the Rams signed Bulger to a four-year, $19.1 million contract. The Rams went 8–8 in 2004, narrowly losing the division to the heavily favored Seattle Seahawks, but earned a wild-card berth in a mediocre NFC.

The Rams defeated Seattle for a third time in the wild-card round, but lost the following week at the hands of the Atlanta Falcons in the Divisional Round by a wide 17–47 margin.

2005 season 
On October 17, against the Indianapolis Colts, Bulger injured his right shoulder. After missing two games, he returned to the field on November, 20 against the Arizona Cardinals where he re-injured his shoulder. He was then placed on IR on Christmas Day in 2005. He finished the 2005 season with 14 Touchdowns, 9 Interceptions and a 94.4 passer rating.

2006 season 
On September 10, 2006, in a game against the Denver Broncos, Bulger reached 1,000 completions faster than any quarterback in NFL history. Bulger achieved this in 45 games, two games less than ex-Rams QB Kurt Warner. Drew Bledsoe and Peyton Manning needed 48 games, and it took Dan Marino 49.

2007 season 
On July 28, 2007, Bulger signed a six-year, $62.5 million contract extension with the Rams, making him the highest-paid player in Rams history. The contract included $27 million in guaranteed money and put him in a group of six quarterbacks making $10 million a year or more. Bulger had one year remaining on a four-year, $19.1 million contract, which would have paid him $4 million in 2007. In the 2007 season, Bulger was plagued with injuries through the entire season as was the entire team. Injuries on the offensive line took effect as he threw more interceptions than touchdowns for the first time in his career. He was considered one of the biggest disappointments of the season, which saw the Rams slump to 3–13.

2008 season 

On September 23, 2008, after starting 0–3, Bulger lost his starting role to Trent Green.  However, seven days later, new head coach Jim Haslett named Marc Bulger the starting quarterback for the rest of the season.
On November 9, 2008 vs the Jets, Haslett replaced Bulger with Green after halftime after the Jets took a 40–0 lead in the first half, cued by four first half Rams turnovers.

A week later he was put back in as starting quarterback. His performances improved slightly as the year went on, but he still turned in another lackluster season with more interceptions than touchdowns and continuously declining completion percentages.

2009 season 
Bulger was placed on season-ending injured reserve on December 26, 2009, as the Rams slumped to a franchise-worst 1–15 record, and a 6–42 record for the three seasons from 2007 to 2009. He had thrown just five touchdown passes during the 2009 season, although his statistics remained where they had been in 2007 and 2008, apart from an improved interception percentage of 2.4 percent vis-à-vis 4 percent.

Bulger asked for, and was granted, his release by the Rams on April 5, 2010, his 33rd birthday.

Baltimore Ravens
On June 23, 2010, Bulger reached an agreement with the Baltimore Ravens on a one-year, $3.8 million deal that also had the possibility of increasing to $5.8 million through incentives. However, Bulger spent the entire season backing up Joe Flacco and never played a single snap.

Retirement
Although several teams were interested in signing him, Bulger announced his retirement from football on August 2, 2011.

NFL career statistics

Personal life
Bulger was born in Pittsburgh, Pennsylvania and graduated from Sacred Heart Middle School and Central Catholic High School in Pittsburgh. He comes from a family of collegiate athletes. His father, Jim, was a quarterback for Notre Dame from 1970–73. His brother Jim was on the Notre Dame golf team, sister Kate was drafted into the WNBA, and youngest sister Meg was a standout guard for his alma mater, West Virginia. Bulger married Mavis Armbruster and has two daughters. His mother is of Irish descent. , he now lives in Brentwood, Tennessee.

Since retirement, Bulger has picked up the sport of curling. He played in the 2018 Curl Mesabi Classic, which is an event of the World Curling Tour. He threw lead rocks for the John Benton team, which included fellow former football player Jared Allen.

References

External links

 

1977 births
Living people
American football quarterbacks
Atlanta Falcons players
Baltimore Ravens players
National Conference Pro Bowl players
New Orleans Saints players
Players of American football from Pittsburgh
Players of American football from St. Louis
St. Louis Rams players
West Virginia Mountaineers football players
Central Catholic High School (Pittsburgh) alumni